Enchocrana is a genus of moths in the family Geometridae. Its only species, Enchocrana lacista, is found in Australia. The genus and species were both first described by Turner in 1930.

References

Oenochrominae
Monotypic moth genera